The 2019 Northern Ontario Scotties Tournament of Hearts, the Northern Ontario women's curling championship, was held January 30 to February 3 at the Nipigon Curling Club in Nipigon. The winning Krista McCarville team represented Northern Ontario at the 2019 Scotties Tournament of Hearts in Sydney, Nova Scotia.

Teams

Round-robin standings

Round-robin results
All draw times are listed in Eastern Time (UTC-05:00)

Draw 1
Wednesday, January 30, 1:00pm

Draw 3
Thursday, January 31, 10:00am

Draw 5
Thursday, January 31, 7:30pm

Draw 7
Friday, February 1, 2:30pm

Draw 8
Friday, February 1, 7:30pm

Draw 10
Saturday, February 2, 2:30pm

Draw 11
Saturday, February 2, 7:30pm

Tiebreaker
Sunday, February 3, 8:30am

Final
Sunday, February 3, 1:00pm

References

2019 Scotties Tournament of Hearts
Ontario Scotties Tournament of Hearts
2019 in Ontario
Sport in Thunder Bay District
January 2019 sports events in Canada
February 2019 sports events in Canada